The bare-cheeked babbler (Turdoides gymnogenys) is a species of bird in the family Leiothrichidae.  It is found in Angola and Namibia.  Its natural habitats are subtropical or tropical dry forest and subtropical or tropical dry shrubland.

References

Collar, N. J. & Robson, C. 2007. Family Timaliidae (Babblers)  pp. 70 – 291 in; del Hoyo, J., Elliott, A. & Christie, D.A. eds. Handbook of the Birds of the World, Vol. 12. Picathartes to Tits and Chickadees. Lynx Edicions, Barcelona.

External links
 Bare-cheeked babbler - Species text in The Atlas of Southern African Birds.

bare-cheeked babbler
Birds of Central Africa
Birds of Southern Africa
bare-cheeked babbler
Taxonomy articles created by Polbot